Lover is the seventh studio album by American singer-songwriter Taylor Swift. It was released on August 23, 2019, through Republic Records, and is her first album release after her departure from Big Machine Records, which resulted in a highly publicized dispute. Swift recorded Lover with producers Jack Antonoff, Joel Little, Louis Bell, and Frank Dukes from November 2018 to February 2019 following her 2018 Reputation Stadium Tour, where she felt motivated by the fans, helping her recover her mental health after the controversies leading up to Reputation (2017). Swift conceived Lover as a "love letter to love", taking inspiration from her recalibrated personal life and newfound artistic freedom.

Compared to the dark, heavy, hip hop-influenced tones of Reputation, Lover brighter sound draws mostly from electropop, pop rock, and synth-pop, with melodies characterized by atmospheric synthesizers, mid-tempo rhythms, and acoustic instruments. The songs incorporate eclectic styles ranging from country and folk to funk and bubblegum pop; they explore emotions such as infatuation, commitment, lust, and heartache; a few discuss contemporary American political issues like LGBT rights and feminism.

Swift, who had secluded herself from media attention after Reputation release, embarked on an extensive promotional campaign for Lover through television shows, magazine covers, and press interviews. Lover cover art and visual aesthetic feature bright pastel colors. Four singles were released—"Me!" featuring Brendon Urie of Panic! at the Disco, "You Need to Calm Down", "Lover", and "The Man"—the first three of which charted in the top 10 of the US Billboard Hot 100. Swift also played City of Lover, a one-day concert in Paris, on September 9, 2019. Lover was Swift's sixth-consecutive album to debut at number one on the US Billboard 200. It also topped the charts in Australia, Canada, Mexico, the UK, and elsewhere, and sold 3.2 million copies in 2019, becoming the year's best-selling studio album.

Lover received positive reviews from music critics, who praised its emotional maturity and free-spirited sound, though some took issue with its disparate musical styles, calling it inconsistent. Many publications included the album in their lists ranking the best albums of 2019. At the 62nd Annual Grammy Awards in 2020, Lover was nominated for Best Pop Vocal Album; the title track was nominated for Song of the Year and "You Need to Calm Down" was nominated for Best Pop Solo Performance. The album won Favorite Pop/Rock Album at the American Music Awards of 2019, and its singles won four MTV Video Music Awards.

Background 

On her synth-pop fifth studio album 1989 (2014), American singer-songwriter Taylor Swift changed her sound and image from country music to pop. Within a year of its release, 1989 sold over five million copies and confirmed Swift's status as a global pop star. During promotion of 1989, Swift was a target of tabloid gossip; her "America's Sweetheart" reputation, a result of her wholesome, innocent image, was tarnished by the publicizing of her romantic relationships and disputes with other celebrities. Swift's mid-2016 dispute with rapper Kanye West, who released the single "Famous", led to an internet cancellation movement against Swift, in which she was labeled a "snake". Swift secluded herself from press attention and released her sixth studio album Reputation in November 2017, as an answer to the media attention surrounding her celebrity. Before Reputation release, Swift cleared her social media accounts, and began posting images and videos of snakes.

Reputation has a dark, heavy, hip hop-influenced production, and contains songs with themes of vengeance and drama. Swift avoided promoting the album in mass media as she had done for her previous albums, instead holding fan-exclusive listening sessions and performing on television a few times without being interviewed. Reputation is the first album Swift released outside her usual two-year album release cycle, and her last under her 12-year, 2006 contract with Big Machine Records. Swift supported Reputation with her Reputation Stadium Tour (2018), on which she used a giant model of a cobra as a stage centerpiece; the tour broke the record for the all-time highest-grossing U.S. tour. In November 2018, upon completing the Reputation Stadium Tour, Swift signed with Universal Music Group label Republic Records, whose contract allowed her to own the master recordings to her albums. She endorsed two Democrat candidates for the 2018 midterm elections in her home state of Tennessee; it was the first time she publicly voiced her political opinion.

Swift said she wrote Reputation as a "defense mechanism" that allowed her to cope with the experience. She secluded herself from press attention because she needed to protect her mental health and stop feeling obliged to "explain herself". Commenting on her forgone "America's Sweetheart" reputation, Swift said it was liberating to relinquish her self-awareness of the title and her attempt to be "always smiling, always happy". On the Reputation Stadium Tour, Swift was inspired by the love she received from fans to embrace positivity and vulnerability; despite her tarnished reputation in the press, she realized her fans "see [her] as a flesh-and-blood human being", which "changed [her] completely, assigning humanity to [her] life". To this end, she conceived her seventh studio album as a personal, vulnerable record that would connect her with her audience and showcase her strengths as a singer-songwriter: "This time around I feel more comfortable being brave enough to be vulnerable, because my fans are brave enough to be vulnerable with me".

Writing and themes 
Swift began writing Lover after having adjusted her personal life, freeing herself from her public image. Reflecting on her experience on the Reputation Stadium Tour, Swift learned to take her occupation as an entertainer less seriously than before. Although she used to think of show business as a competitive battlefield, as she performed on tour she realized; "We're just entertaining people, and it's supposed to be fun". Swift reconsidered her social media appearances and realized her focus was her music rather than her social media influence. These realizations inspired Swift to embrace her newfound artistic creativity and write songs from a free-spirited perspective. As with her songwriting for previous albums, Swift wrote Lover as a reflection of her personal life, describing it as very confessional and autobiographical, yet also playful and whimsical.

In the September 2019 issue of Vogue, Swift described Lover as a "love letter to love, in all of its maddening, passionate, exciting, enchanting, horrific, tragic, wonderful glory". The track list consists of 18 songs—more than any of her other albums—depicting many sentiments stemming from love. Whereas the protagonists of the songs on Reputation are exaggerated characters Swift created as a reaction to the controversies, the songs on Lover are written from an honest, lighthearted perspective, and are inspired by her first-time discovery of "love that was very real". The album's central theme is love; Swift said she envisioned it as a romantic record; in addition to happy songs, it includes songs about sorrow and loneliness, which she said one can perceive "through a romantic gaze". Music critics noted Lover as Swift's return to her songwriting tradition of exploring love and emotional intimacy after the antagonistic viewpoints of its predecessor, representing her confidence, and her artistic and personal liberation.

Most of the tracks on Lover are  straightforward, open-hearted love songs celebrating the ups and downs of love. Its lyrics are about Swift's personal life but also engage universally relatable feelings that can be applied to many people's relationships, according to Time critic Dana Schwartz. Although her songs are very personal, Swift avoided disclosing the inspiration behind them.

Lover opening track "I Forgot That You Existed" was inspired by Swift's adjusted personal life; its narrator no longer dwells on vengeance against those who wronged them. The title track "Lover", is about Swift's commitment to a romantic partner; the ways couples customize their marriage vows inspired her to write the bridge. Lust is explored in the tracks "I Think He Knows", which is about self-confidence after a reciprocated infatuation; and "False God", in which the protagonist ponders the ways false promises can help overcome the challenges of a long-distance relationship. According to Dave Holmes of Esquire, "False God" may be about either religion or oral sex.

Some songs—such as "Paper Rings", in which Swift narrates a relationship from its beginning to her proposal of marriage; and "London Boy", on which she declares her love for an Englishman with tongue-in-cheek lyrics that name locations in London and the English fashion designer Stella McCartney—portray playful, quirky aspects of love. The lead single "Me!" is about self-affirmation, self-love, and self-acceptance; the album version omits the lyric "Hey kids, spelling is fun" of the previously-released single version. The penultimate track "It's Nice to Have a Friend" tells a love story that begins in childhood and proceeds to adulthood. Swift considered the song a representation of the feelings one wishes to experience whether they are a child or an adult because "we all want love, we all want to find somebody to ... experience things with".

Other songs explore introspective and poignant aspects of love and life; some are about the pitfalls of romance; Swift assumes responsibility for a failed relationship. "The Archer" is about Swift reflecting on her life; its lyrics describe her self-awareness and acknowledgement of her past mistakes. On "Cruel Summer", she sings about the painful feelings ensuing from a fleeting summer romance. "Cornelia Street", whose title refers to a New York City street on which Swift had rented a townhouse, narrates a relationship in which Swift is afraid she will lose her partner again if she repeats her earlier mistakes. On "Afterglow", she takes the blame for having hurt her partner, and contemplates a loved one's prolonged medical treatment on "Soon You'll Get Better", which was inspired by her parents' cancer diagnoses.

"Death by a Thousand Cuts" was inspired by the romantic comedy film Someone Great, and explores the protagonist's attempts to overcome the painful remnants of a failed relationship. "Death by a Thousand Cuts", which Swift wrote for Lover, was not inspired by her personal life; it was "incredible news" to her as she realized she could continue writing songs about heartbreak, even if she was in a healthy relationship. In the closing track, "Daylight", Swift contemplates that love to her now is "golden" rather than "burning red" as she once believed; a reference to the title track of her 2012 studio album Red. The track concludes with Swift speaking; "I want to be defined by the things that I love—not the things I hate, not the things I'm afraid of, the things that haunt me in the middle of the night". The song represents Swift's mature understanding of love, her personal life, and her public image.

A few songs reflect Swift's perception of contemporary American politics. Since her 2006 debut as a country-music artist, Swift's record company had warned her against becoming involved in politics, but after witnessing the political events affecting the rights of certain people, she became disillusioned with the American political climate and decided to abandon her apolitical stance. Swift wrote "Miss Americana & the Heartbreak Prince" after the 2018 midterm elections; its lyrics use high school as a metaphor for American politics because she thought the social events of a traditional American high school, like the political landscape, can alienate some people. Another track, "The Man", was inspired by the double standards women experience the music industry and in wider society. "You Need to Calm Down" has lyrics advocating for LGBT rights; it was inspired by a conversation in which a friend asked Swift what she would do if she had a gay son; other inspirations were cyberbullies, cancel culture, and the way the mass media "pits [women] against each other". Explaining how the track aligns with the album's concept, Swift said it addresses the discrimination some people encounter because of who they love.

Production and musical styles 
Swift started recording Lover in November 2018, soon after she completed the Reputation Stadium Tour. She wanted to incorporate eclectic styles to accompany the diverse lyrical themes, which was made possible by her new contract with Republic Records granting her more artistic freedom than before. Swift recorded much of Lover with Jack Antonoff, who had produced 1989 and Reputation; other producers are Joel Little, Frank Dukes, and Louis Bell, all of whom were first-time collaborators of Swift. The producers of respective tracks are credited as their co-writers alongside Swift, except for songs Swift wholly wrote; "Lover", "Cornelia Street", and "Daylight". Hip-hop producer Sounwave is credited as co-writer and co-producer of "London Boy", singer Brendon Urie is credited as co-writer of "Me!", and musician St. Vincent, who is credited as Annie Clark, is co-writer of "Cruel Summer".

While recording, Swift revisited musical styles with which she had earlier experimented. While she associated Reputation musical style, devoid of acoustic instruments, with imagery of "nighttime cityscape ... old warehouse buildings that had been deserted and factory spaces", she conceptualized Lover as "a barn wood floor and some ripped curtains flowing in the breeze, and fields of flowers"; the songs on Lover use many acoustic instruments. Swift recorded her vocals as though she were performing live, stating much of the album is nearly whole takes. In publications' reviews, music critics categorized Lover as primarily a pop album with a 1980s-influenced sound combining pop rock and electropop. Compared to the dark, hip hop tones of its predecessor, Lover musical styles are brighter, more lighthearted, and atmospheric. The tracks are of varying tempo, and are built on straightforward song structures with piano melodies, rock arrangements, and standard chord progressions; a few experiment with styles and song structures that were new to Swift.

Antonoff co-produced 11 tracks, all of which were recorded at Electric Lady Studios in New York City; "Paper Rings", "London Boy", and "Daylight" were additionally recorded at Metropolis Studios in London; the first two tracks, and "Cruel Summer" and "I Think He Knows", were additionally recorded at Conway Recording Studios in Los Angeles. Antonoff's production is characterized by 1980s drums, atmospheric synthesizers, and reverbed beats, exploring eclectic styles across genres including synth-pop, punk, folk pop, and quiet storm. Because of Antonoff's 1980s-style production, some critics commented Lover expands on the 1980s synth-pop sound of 1989. Billboard journalist Jason Lipshutz commented Lover is not an expansion on 1989 sound but a more-ambitious record that is larger in scope. Swift conceptualized tracks like "Lover" and "Paper Rings" as songs that might have been played in a 1970s wedding reception; as such, these tracks use retro instruments to bring forth the timeless feel she desired. For "Lover", Swift and Antonoff used instruments that, according to Swift, were invented before the 1970s; it is a waltzing-tempo track combining indie folk and alternative country with acoustic guitar, percussion, and pizzicato strings. "Paper Rings" is a gleeful new wave-influenced pop punk track with influences from rockabilly and 1980s pop.

Many songs produced with Antonoff have a radio-friendly pop production. "Cruel Summer" is a 1980s-influenced, synth-pop song with pulsating synthesizers and distorted vocals, and "London Boy" is a bubblegum pop song with layered synthesizers and repeated beats. The upbeat, electropop and R&B track "I Think He Knows" features influences of funk with Swift's falsetto vocals over guitars, a deep bass, and a marching beat. Despite its lyrics about a painful heartbreak, "Death by a Thousand Cuts" has an upbeat production with a recurring guitar line, quivering synthesizers, and faint church bells with vocal harmonies in the background. The ballads "The Archer", "Cornelia Street", and "Daylight" are characterized by dense, atmospheric synthesizers; the first of which combines dream pop and synth-pop with steady kick drum beats throughout. "Soon You'll Get Better" and "False God", which were  produced with Antonoff, feature subtler production compared to the dominant uptempo sound. "Soon You'll Get Better" is a country ballad featuring slide guitars and the Dixie Chicks contributing background harmonies, banjo, and fiddle. "False God" combines elements of jazz, trap, neo-soul, and 1980s R&B; Swift sings over hiccuping vocal samples and a lone saxophone line.

Little co-produced four tracks on Lover; these were recorded at Electric Lady Studios in New York, Golden Age Studios in Los Angeles, and Golden Age West in Auckland, New Zealand. Swift had first met Little at a Broods concert in Los Angeles; they got acquainted at the New Zealand show of her Reputation Stadium Tour. Shortly after, Swift invited Little to New York to record songs with her; "Me!" is one of the first songs they created together. "Me!", which features Brendon Urie of Panic! at the Disco, contains pop hooks, and the horns and marching band drums in the refrain evoke a 1960s big band sound. "Miss Americana & the Heartbreak Prince" is at atmospheric, gloomy, synth-pop track with shouting cheerleaders' voice in the background. The synth-pop tunes "The Man" and "You Need to Calm Down" feature pulsating synthesizers; "The Man" is built on a pulsating drum beat and "You Need to Calm Down" features cascading vocal echoes in the refrain.

The three tracks Swift produced with Bell and Dukes, which were recorded at Electric Feel Studios in Los Angeles, have an experimental quality. The opening track "I Forgot That You Existed" is a lighthearted post-tropical house tune that is built on piano and finger snaps. The power ballad "Afterglow" has a slow-building melody consisting of slow bass and Swift's falsetto vocals. Some critics considered the penultimate track "It's Nice to Have a Friend" as the album's most original and experimental song. The song includes a sample of "Summer in the South" from the Toronto-based Regent Park School of Music's album Parkscapes; it has a sparse production with steelpans, harps, and tubular bells; and is punctuated by a trumpet solo and church bells near the middle. Swift said she wrote the track with only verses, and was more focused on the "vibe and feeling", contrasting her usual songwriting with a clear refrain and structure. Recording wrapped on February 24, 2019; a sample of Cautious Clay's song "Cold War" used for "London Boy" was approved in June that year.

Release and promotion

Title and artwork 

Swift initially considered choosing "Daylight" as the album's title track but scrapped the idea because she thought it is too sentimental. She picked Lover as the title because she felt it better represents the overall theme and is "more elastic as a concept"; songs such as "You Need to Calm Down", which is about LGBT rights, could align with this concept. Colombian photographer and collage artist Valheria Rocha, who worked with Swift on the album's art direction, photographed and edited the album's cover art. The cover depicts Swift with sapphire hair tips and a pink, glittery heart shape on her right eye in front of colorful, pink clouds. Some media commented the artwork evokes the atmosphere of summer and music festivals.

Swift used the bright, pastel colors of the cover art in her social media posts and clothing during promotion of Lover, departing from the dark, black-and-white art and aesthetic of Reputation. In an article for Entertainment Weekly, Emma Madden said Lover cover art looks like "a fan-made aesthetic post on Tumblr", and called it part of the emerging trend of "kitschy album artwork". By using cover art that deliberately looks like a fan-made product rather than art commissioned from professional graphic designers, Lover brought "a level of iconicness and relatability" to Swift's audience because, according to Rocha, they could create their own versions of the cover art.

Marketing 

Three singles preceded Lover. Swift released the first, "Me!" featuring Brendon Urie of Panic! at the Disco, on April 26, having commissioned a large butterfly mural in a Nashville neighborhood and a social-media countdown. The second single "You Need to Calm Down" was released on June 14 after Swift encouraged her fans to call for the passing of the Equality Act on her social media feeds; the media viewed this release as Swift's intention for the release to coincide with Pride Month. The title track was released as the third single on August 16. All three singles peaked in the top ten of the US Billboard Hot 100, and the first two peaked at number two. "Me!" broke the record for the largest single-week jump when it rose from number 100 to number two after one week. "The Archer" was released as a promotional single on July 23. A fourth single, "The Man", was released on January 27, 2020.

Whereas Swift avoided social media and public appearances during promotion of Reputation, she embarked on an extensive promotional campaign for Lover on social media, televised events, and press interviews. Media speculation on Swift's follow-up to Reputation arose when she appeared at the 2019 iHeartRadio Music Awards in March, where she was adorned with butterfly motifs and pastel tones, the aesthetic she later used in her clothing for public appearances. Her social media posts showed her outgoing, comfortable persona, departing from the dark, antagonistic image she adopted for Reputation. Swift conducted interviews with publications including Entertainment Weekly, The Guardian, Vogue, and Rolling Stone, where she openly spoke about her adjusted personal life. A few weeks before the album's release, Swift invited a select group of fans to private Secret Sessions listening parties in London, Nashville, and Los Angeles; she had hosted similar sessions for 1989 and Reputation. She also gave interviews on the US morning television programs CBS Sunday Morning and Good Morning America, and the talk shows The Ellen DeGeneres Show and The Tonight Show Starring Jimmy Fallon.

Swift promoted Lover with corporate tie-ins and promotional deals, including a merchandise deal with Capital One, airplay deals with SiriusXM and iHeartMedia, a deal with YouTube Music with Swift hosting a live stream on the platform, an Amazon deal featuring images of Swift on packaging and an exclusive concert for Amazon Prime users, and a Target Corporation deal to distribute four deluxe editions of Lover on CD; the deluxe editions were also available on Swift's website. Each deluxe edition contains a CD with two bonus audio memos, a blank journal, a poster and different bonus content of Swift's old journal entries and photos. She also collaborated with English fashion designer Stella McCarntey on a limited-edition merchandise collection.

Lover was released on both digital and physical formats on August 23, 2019, through Republic Records; it was her first album after ending her 12-year contract with Big Machine Records, her first released on streaming from its first week, and the first whose master recording she owned. Leading up to the release, Swift was involved in a public dispute over the ownership of her Big Machine Records albums' master recordings. In a social media post on June 30, 2019, after Big Machine had been acquired by manager Scooter Braun, Swift accused the label of having neglected her desire to acquire the master recordings and called the deal with Braun, whom she deemed an "incessant, manipulative [bully]", the "worst-case scenario". After Lover was released, Swift began implementing her plan to re-record her past albums.

Swift performed on many televised shows, starting with a performance of "Me!" with Brendon Urie at the 2019 Billboard Music Awards on May 1. She again performed the song with Urie on The Voice, and alone on Germany's Next Topmodel, The Graham Norton Show, and the French version of The Voice. At the 2019 MTV Video Music Awards, where she won three awards, Swift opened the show with a medley of "You Need to Calm Down" and "Lover". Swift later performed Lover songs on BBC Radio 1's Live Lounge, Saturday Night Live, NPR Music's Tiny Desk Concert, the Jingle Bell Ball 2019 in London, and iHeartRadio Z100's Jingle Ball in New York City. She also promoted the album on Nippon TV's Sukkiri Morning Show in Tokyo and at the Singles' Day Countdown Gala by Alibaba Group in Shanghai.

At the 2019 American Music Awards, at which Swift was honored as the Artist of the Decade, she performed a medley of "The Man", "Lover", and her past singles. On May 17, 2020, ABC aired a concert special titled Taylor Swift: City of Lover, which was filmed at her September 2019 one-off concert in Paris. Swift planned to embark on a worldwide festival and concert tour titled Lover Fest, which was due to begin in mid-2020 and included four shows in the U.S., ten shows in Europe, and two shows in Brazil. It was officially cancelled in February 2021 due to the global COVID-19 pandemic.

On March 17, 2023, ahead of the Eras Tour, Swift made "All of the Girls You Loved Before" available for digital download and streaming, featuring cover artwork from Lover. The song, leaked in February 2023, had received attention on social media as an unreleased track from the album.

Media response 

Lover received extensive media coverage; the BBC's Nick Levine wrote; "if it doesn't become her sixth in succession to top the Billboard 200, it would be a major music industry shock". Some publications noted the extensive promotional campaign was old-fashioned compared to the emerging trend of surprise album releases in the digital era; Rolling Stone Elias Leight commented Swift was the last-remaining pop star to rely on radio push and corporate tie-ins to promote albums. Her first album released on streaming platforms from the beginning, it was noted in some articles as a sign Swift had abandoned her anti-streaming stance. Because of Swift's Billboard 200 record of having four albums sell over one million copies each, some journalists debated whether she would achieve the feat the fifth time, and whether streaming would impact its sales figures.

Some reviewers said they thought Lover would perform well on charts even if critical reviews were negative, and that it was also a means for Swift to rebuild her public image after the Reputation controversies, and the dispute with Big Machine and Braun. Kate Knibbs from The Ringer wrote; "as Swift tries to control the narrative, it is a reminder that ... Swift has achieved an American Dream—she's too big to fail". Billboard Andrew Unterberger, noting the diverse styles and themes of the four songs released prior to Lover—"Me!", "You Need to Calm Down", "The Archer", and "Lover"—said Swift released Lover to focus on her artistic merit on her own terms, and not because she wanted to control her image. In the September 2019 issue of Entertainment Weekly, Maura Johnston commented although Swift's blurring of the line between the personal and the promotional, and although her social media posts might prompt tabloid gossip, Lover should stand the test of time with its best songs.

Critical reception 

In mainstream publications, Lover received positive reviews from music critics. At review-aggregating website  Metacritic, which assigns a normalized rating out of 100 to reviews from mainstream publications, the album received a mean score of 79, which is based on 26 reviews.

Most reviewers commended the album's themes of positivity and emotional intimacy. Many critics, including Jon Caramanica in The New York Times, Neil McCormick in The Daily Telegraph, and Robert Christgau in his Substack-published Consumer Guide column, welcomed Lover as Swift's return-to-form, praised her emotional songwriting ability, and said compared to Reputation antagonistic themes about celebrity, Lover is a sign of Swift's embracing of forward-looking perspectives. Others such as Mikael Wood from the Los Angeles Times and Annie Zaleski from The A.V. Club commented on its emotional maturity that represents Swift's grown-up perspectives.

Praise for the track list's length and diverse musical styles was more reserved. Those complimentary of Lover welcomed its disparate styles as a representation of Swift's creative freedom. Vanity Fair critic Erin Vanderhoof said Lover production "[ties] together a lot of the best impulses in recent pop, in a way that feels like a road map for [pop music's] survival". Nick Catucci in Rolling Stone called the album "evolutionary rather than revolutionary", and appreciated its "free and unhurried" styles. Others, taking issue with its length, commented although Lover is a solid album, it could have been a better record with some refinements. In The Observer, Kitty Empire deemed this "a partial retrenchment until Swift decides what to do next". Paste Claire Martin was critical, deeming the music unimpressive and the lyrics, despite their heartwarming nature, "lacking any profound meaning".

Some critics viewed the album as a culmination of Swift's strengths as a singer-songwriter on her past albums, with particular comparisons to Red (2012); Schwartz and Anna Gaca from Pitchfork also highlighted the personal lyricism that recalls Speak Now (2010). In The Guardian, Alexis Petridis viewed Lover as a testament to Swift's songwriting abilities but commented the genre-spanning styles feel like "consolidation, not progress", and a conservative effort to maintain her commercial success. Carl Wilson from Slate wrote although Lover is a sophisticated album, it is held back by Swift's efforts to satisfy her audience.

Year-end lists 

Many publications ranked Lover in their lists of the best albums of 2019. It appeared on the top-tens of lists by Billboard, People, and USA Today. Some publications, including American Songwriter and MTV, included it in their unranked lists. In individual critics' list, the album was ranked within the top ten by Zaleski, Wood, Sheffield, and Willman, with the last two naming it the best album of 2019.

Commercial performance 
Variety, citing Republic Records, reported Lover sold nearly one million copies before its release. In the U.S., the album sold around 450,000 copies in its first day and debuted at number one on the Billboard 200 with first-week tally of 867,000 album-equivalent units, of which 679,000 were pure sales. It is Swift's sixth U.S. number-one album and made her the first female artist to have six albums sell more than 500,000 copies each in one week. In its opening week, Lover outsold all of the other 199 albums on the chart combined, becoming the first album to do so since Swift's Reputation (2017). All of Lover 18 tracks simultaneously charted on the Billboard Hot 100, breaking the record for the most simultaneous chart entries for a female artist. With Lover, Swift returned to the top of the Billboard Artist 100 chart for a thirty-seventh week, extending her all-time record as the longest-running number-one act.

The Recording Industry Association of America (RIAA) certified Lover platinum, denoting one million album-equivalent units, after four weeks of release. The only million-selling U.S. album of 2019, it sold 1.085 million pure copies, both physical and digital, becoming the year's best-selling album. It was the fourth time Swift had the best-selling album of a calendar year in the U.S., after Fearless (2009), 1989 (2014), and Reputation (2017). Combining singles sales and streaming, Lover sold 2.191 million units throughout the year. By October 2022, the RIAA certified it triple-platinum and it had sold 1.5 million pure copies in the U.S.

The album peaked atop the charts in Australia, New Zealand, the U.K. (including Scotland), Ireland, and Canada; and received platinum certifications in Australia, New Zealand, and the U.K.— including a double platinum certification by Australian Recording Industry Association (ARIA). Lover is Swift's fifth number-one album in Australia, making her the artist with the most Australian number-one albums of the 2010s decade. In both the U.K. and Ireland, it made Swift the first female artist in the 2010s to have four number-one albums. Lover also peaked atop the albums charts of Latvia, Lithuania, the Netherlands, Norway, Portugal, Spain, and Sweden. In China, Lover became the first international album to sell more than one million units within its first release week, and made Swift the first international artist to have three million-selling albums, after 1989 and Reputation.

Lover sold more than 3.2 million copies worldwide in 2019, becoming the year's best-selling album by a solo artist and the second overall, behind Japanese group Arashi's greatest hits album 5x20 All the Best!! 1999–2019. The International Federation of the Phonographic Industry (IFPI) recognized Swift as the Global Recording Artist of 2019, making her the first female artist to twice earn that honor—her first being in 2014.

Accolades 

In 2019, Lover won accolades at awards shows including Favorite Album of the Year at the People's Choice Awards, Best International Artist at the ARIA Awards, and two album-sales awards at the BuzzAngle Music Awards. At the 2019 American Music Awards, at which Swift was honored as Artist of the Decade, Lover won Favorite Pop/Rock Album. Winning four other awards, Swift was the most-awarded artist of the night, and with 29 wins was the most-awarded in AMAs history. The music videos for Lover singles won four awards at the MTV Video Music Awards; in 2019, "You Need to Calm Down" won Video of the Year and Video for Good, and "Me!" won Best Visual Effects; and in 2020, "The Man" won Best Direction.

At the 62nd Annual Grammy Awards in 2020, Lover was nominated for Best Pop Vocal Album, which went to When We All Fall Asleep, Where Do We Go? by Billie Eilish. Lover singles "You Need to Calm Down" and "Lover" were respectively nominated for Best Pop Solo Performance (lost to "Truth Hurts" by Lizzo) and Song of the Year (lost to "Bad Guy" by Eilish). Lover won Pop Album of the Year at the iHeartRadio Music Awards, an award in Sales and Marketing (Packaging Campaign) by the American Advertising Federation in Nashville, and was nominated for Top Billboard 200 Album at the Billboard Music Awards. The album won Album of the Year (Western) at the Japan Gold Disc Awards, Best Selling Album (English) at Hong Kong's RTHK International Pop Poll Awards, and a Music Jacket Creative Award at Japan's CD Shop Awards.

Retrospective 
In January 2020, Swift released a Netflix documentary titled Miss Americana, which was directed by Lana Wilson. The documentary, which is titled after the album's seventh track, chronicles the creation and promotion of Lover, and discusses it as an evolutionary phase in Swift's career. It also features the Lover outtake "Only the Young". After canceling the Lover Fest tour due to the COVID-19 pandemic, without prior announcements, Swift released her eighth studio album Folklore, in July 2020, 11 months after Lover release. Journalists noted Lover as Swift's final album that was supported by a "long, fancy pop-album roll-out" before she began using surprise album releases, starting with Folklore.

Retrospective critical commentary has discussed ways Lover changed Swift's image and artistry from the antagonistic tone of Reputation. Mary Siroky of Consequence placed Lover last on her 2021 ranking of Swift's studio albums, saying; "It feels a bit too much like an unnecessary course correction from [Reputation], rather than a collection of themes Swift was really interested in pursuing". In a USA Today article commemorating Lover two-year anniversary, David Oliver and Hannah Yasharoff lamented the canceled tour and called the album Swift's "lost masterpiece" that represents her artistic maturity and autonomy. After its songs featured on the Amazon Prime Video series The Summer I Turned Pretty in June 2022, Lover re-entered the Billboard 200 chart's top 40. "It's Nice to Have a Friend" featured prominently in the promotion of M3GAN, a 2023 horror film.

On August 24, 2022, Billboard reported author Teresa La Dart alleged in a copyright infringement complaint filed on August 23 in a Tennessee federal court a number of creative elements of the companion book bundled with the deluxe CD editions of Lover were copied from La Dart's 2010 book, which is also titled Lover. The alleged similarities are the pastel aesthetic, a photograph "in a downward pose",  and the book's diary format with "interspersed photographs and writings". La Dart's lawyer said Swift owes in "excess of one million dollars" in damages. Lawyers who spoke to Billboard said La Dart's case is "deeply flawed", that copyrights do not protect titles and formats of creative works, and that more than 12 other books titled Lover exist.

Track listing 
Credits adapted from the album liner notes

Notes
  signifies a co-producer
 "London Boy" contains a sample of "Cold War" by Cautious Clay.

Personnel 
Credits adapted from the album's liner notes

 Taylor Swift – vocals, writer, producer ; executive producer; journal entries ; personal photographies ; packaging creative direction; percussion 
 Jack Antonoff – producer, keyboards, programming, recording ; writer ; piano ; live drums ; acoustic guitars ; electric guitars ; percussion, bass ; vocoder ; synthesizers ; guitar ; Wurlitzer ; background vocals 
 Louis Bell – producer, writer, programming, recording ; keyboards 
 Frank Dukes – producer, writer, guitar, programming 
 Joel Little – producer, writer, recording, keyboards, drum programming ; synths, guitar 
 Laura Sisk – recording ; background vocals 
 Annie Clark – writer, guitar 
 Şerban Ghenea – mixing
 John Hanes – mix engineer
 Randy Merrill – mastering
 Grant Strumwasser – assistant 
 John Rooney – assistant 
 Jon Sher – assistant 
 Nick Mills – assistant 
 Joe Harrison – guitar 
 Serafin Aguilar – trumpet 
 David Urquidi – saxophone 
 Steve Hughes – trombone 
 Michael Riddleberger – live drums 
 Sounwave – co-producer, writer 
 Cautious Clay – writer 
 Sean Hutchinson – live drums 
 Mikey Freedom Hart – keyboards ; background vocals 
 Evan Smith – keyboards, saxophones 
 Emily Strayer – banjo 
 Martie Maguire – fiddle 
 The Dixie Chicks – featured artist 
 Brandon Bost – background vocals 
 Cassidy Ladden – background vocals 
 Ken Lewis – background vocals 
 Matthew Tavares – guitar 
 Brendon Urie – featured artist, writer 
 Valheria Rocha – photography
 Andrea Swift – personal photographies 
 Scott Swift – personal photographies 
 Joseph Cassel – wardrobe stylist
 Riawna Capri – hair
 Lorrie Turk – makeup
 Josh & Bethany Newman – packaging art direction
 Parker Foote – packaging design
 Jin Kim – packaging design
 Ryon Nishimori – packaging design
 Abby Murdock – packaging design

Charts

Weekly charts

Year-end charts

Certifications

See also 

 List of 2019 albums
 List of Billboard 200 number-one albums of 2019
 List of number-one albums of 2019 (Australia)
 List of number-one albums of 2019 (Belgium)
 List of number-one albums of 2019 (Canada)
 List of number-one albums of 2019 (Ireland)
 List of number-one albums from the 2010s (New Zealand)
 List of number-one albums of 2019 (Mexico)
 List of number-one albums in Norway
 List of number-one albums of 2019 (Scotland)
 List of number-one albums of 2019 (Sweden)
 List of UK Albums Chart number ones of the 2010s
 List of UK Album Downloads Chart number ones of the 2010s
 List of best-selling albums in China

Footnotes

References

Cited literature

External links 
 

2019 albums
Taylor Swift albums
Republic Records albums
Albums produced by Taylor Swift
Albums produced by Jack Antonoff
Albums produced by Joel Little
Albums produced by Louis Bell
Albums produced by Frank Dukes
Albums recorded at Electric Lady Studios
Electropop albums
Synth-pop albums by American artists
Pop rock albums by American artists